Adrenocortical dysplasia protein homolog is a protein that in humans is encoded by the ACD gene.

Function 

This gene encodes a protein that is involved in telomere function. This protein is one of six core proteins in the telosome/shelterin telomeric complex, which functions to maintain telomere length and to protect telomere ends. Through its interaction with other components, this protein plays a key role in the assembly and stabilization of this complex, and it mediates the access of telomerase to the telomere. Multiple transcript variants encoding different isoforms have been found for this gene. This gene, which is also referred to as TPP1, is distinct from the unrelated TPP1 gene on chromosome 11, which encodes tripeptidyl-peptidase I.

TPP1 is a component of the telomere-specific shelterin complex, which facilitates the replication of the double-stranded telomeric DNA tracts and protects the telomeric end from unregulated DNA repair activities. TPP1 mainly functions as a regulator of telomerase recruitment, activation, and regulation. Although TPP1 was originally described as a bridging factor between TRF1 and TRF2, which participate in a pathway with POT1 as a negative regulator of telomerase-dependent telomere length control, more recent studies suggest that TPP1 could directly promotes telomerase activity at the telomere. A part of the TPP1 oligonucleotide/oligosaccharide-binding (OB) fold named TEL patch that interacts with the catalytic subunit of telomerase, hTERT, has been proven essential for telomerase activation. TPP1 has also been demonstrated as the only pathway required for recruitment of telomerase to chromosome ends, and it also defines telomere length homeostasis in hESCs.

Interactions 

ACD (gene) has been shown to interact with POT1 and TINF2.

 POT1 
 hTERT  
 TIN2
 TRF1 
 TRF2 
 Telomerase

References

External links
 
 
 PDBe-KB provides an overview of all the structure information available in the PDB for Human Adrenocortical dysplasia protein homolog

Further reading 

 
 
 
 
 
 
 
 
 
 
 
 
 

Human proteins
Telomere-binding proteins